Oleg Igorevich Kuvaev (born 6 February 1967) is a Russian-Israeli artist, designer and animator, known for his Masyanya flash-animated series. Since first appearing in the Russian Internet on October 22, 2001, "Masyanya" has become nearly a cult figure. 

Kuvaev created the series by himself - he made up the characters and the stories, drew the flash-animated cartoons, recorded the sound, and uploaded the series (each of them about 3–4 minutes long) in the Internet.

Biography
Oleg Igorevich Kuvaev was born on 6 February 1967 in Saint Petersburg (Leningrad). He studied first at a school specializing in the English language, then at school majoring in physics and mathematics. Afterwards there were a number of higher institutions (including the Leningrad Institute of Aviation Instrumentation, Academy of Arts) and service in the Soviet Army. Then, he changed a lot of professions and places, mostly active as a painter and sculptor for more than 10 years, till the times of "Big Worldwide Web" come.

From 1987 he was mainly into painting and sculpture, and from 1997 he turned to computer graphics. Kuvaev worked as a designer in several studios, in "computer gaming" industry as 3D animator and modeler, as web-designer, even java-programmer, in his free time experimenting with various computer technologies including freshly appearing vector animation (macromedia flash).

In 2001 he founded “Mult.ru” studio to create his flash-animated series Masyanya. Initially, the project started with ten short rough-made cartoons about hooligan girl from Saint Petersburg but eventually it became popular among Russian-speaking community. This resulted in epidemic masyanization of the whole country, which is perhaps the major achievement of Kuvaev. Full of fresh indigenous humor (sometimes caustic and absurd but still kind at bottom) the series about Masyanya appealed to the young generation whose life, interests and problems they actually focused on, at the same time embodying an alternative to commercial mass-culture.

The popularity of Masyanya made Oleg Kuvaev expend much effort fighting for the copyright to his own creation between 2003–2005. Kuvaev was forced to fight in the forefront of struggling for copyright laws in Russia which was the stronghold of piracy at this time. Many Russian companies have illegally profited from Masyanya and, worse, have at times distorted the essence of the character. For example, Oleg Kuvaev had to apply to court to compel the closing of the shoddy commercial talk show At Masyanya’s broadcast at the Russian pop-music TV channel Muz-TV that was using this character illegally, without permission. And finally Oleg and his team has won three such trials on copyright proving that the "times are changing".

Until quite recently, Oleg Kuvaev worked as the art-director and owner of “Mult.ru” studio. Besides Masyanya, the studio has released three more animated cartoon series: Eji and Petrutchoe, Six and a Half and Magazinchik Boe. Just like Masyanya, they could be downloaded from the Internet free of charge and were translated in different TV-channels across Russia. Also numerous advertising cartoons, illustrations and even radio-shows were produced.

Masyanya brought the studio about most of the income in merchandise and mobile services. The studio received copyright charges from companies that used the brand. Ice cream, cookies, DVDs, T-shirts and much more merchandise with Masyanya’s brand now were produced legally. Mobile operators were selling pictures, videos and ring-tones from Masyanya plentiful, which brought stable income. Despite this, suddenly, in the middle of 2006 Oleg Kuvaev closed all projects he was working on, left the studio, the city and the country, with almost no response whatsoever as the other workers of Mult.ru had kicked him out of his own company.

In 2022, together with Russian rock band Nogu Svelo!, Kuvaev created the Anthem of the Doomed, an anti-war animated video dedicated to Russians who support the Russian invasion of Ukraine.

Now he lives in Ramat Gan, Israel, with his wife, Polina, and his son and daughter. All studio projects are closed except his first and favorite - Masyanya. As of 2008, there are summary more than 150 episodes of the cartoon in release. And new episodes still appear made by Oleg Kuvaev himself as in the beginning of the whole story. All of them are available on his website and YouTube channel.

References

External links
Masyanya's official site
English portfolio of Oleg Kuvaev

1967 births
Living people
Artists from Saint Petersburg
Flash artists
Russian animators
Russian activists against the 2022 Russian invasion of Ukraine
Russian emigrants to Israel